The 2021 Chaman bombings were two bombing attacks in Chaman, Balochistan, Pakistan, that occurred on 24 March and 21 May. These attacks left 10 people dead and another 27 injured.

Background
The insurgency in Balochistan is a long-running low-intensity insurgency by Baloch nationalists in southwestern Pakistan and southeastern Iran. Chaman was previously bombed in 2017.

Bombings

24 March
A bomb left 3 people dead and another 13 were injured.

The terrorist act involved the detonation of a remote-controlled bomb placed in a motorcycle. The target of the attack was a senior police officer. The explosion occurred as the police car was about to pass the motorcycle. Among the 3 dead was a child, while two security personnel were among the 13 wounded. The Pakistani Taliban claimed responsibility for the attack.

21 May
A bomb killed 7 people and another 14 were injured. The attack occurred at a pro-Palestinian protest. 21 May has been declared as Palestine Solidarity Day by the Pakistani government, following the Israeli bombing of Palestinians. To mark the National Day of Solidarity, Jamiat-e-Ulema Islam, one of Pakistan's leading religious political organizations, organized a protest march. The improvised explosive device exploded just as the demonstrators had finished their protest march.

See also

 List of terrorist incidents in 2021

References

2021 in Balochistan, Pakistan
2021 murders in Pakistan
2020s crimes in Balochistan, Pakistan
21st-century mass murder in Pakistan
Improvised explosive device bombings in 2021
2021
March 2021 crimes in Asia
Mass murder in 2021
Mass murder in Balochistan, Pakistan
May 2021 crimes in Asia
Motorcycle bombings
Terrorist incidents in Pakistan in 2021
March 2021 events in Pakistan